X-Flight may refer to one of two roller coasters:
 X-Flight (Six Flags Great America), a wing roller coaster at Six Flags Great America
 X-Flight (Geauga Lake), a former flying roller coaster at Geauga Lake